The York Liberal Jewish Community is a Jewish community based in York, North Yorkshire, England. It was founded in 2014 and is a constituent member of  Liberal Judaism. It holds services, usually on the second Saturday of the month, in York

See also
 List of Jewish communities in the United Kingdom

References

External links 
 Official website
 Jewish Small Communities Network: York Liberal Jewish Community
 York Liberal Jewish Community on Jewish Communities and Records – UK (hosted by JewishGen)

 2014 establishments in England
Liberal synagogues in the United Kingdom
Organisations based in York
Religion in Yorkshire
Religious organizations established in 2014
Jewish organizations established in the 2010s